The Green Screen international wildlife film festival is held annually in and around Eckernförde, Germany. The festival shows full-length and short nature documentaries about animals in their natural habitat. Around 30,000 visitors make it the largest nature film festival in Europe. The awarded trophy is made of sand.

Since 2007 films are shown in cinemas of Eckernförde and on mobile screens in the city and in surrounding locations.

In 2008 Inge Sielmann, the widow of Heinz Sielmann, donated a special prize for filmmakers that is endowed with 5,000 Euros.

Selected awardees

2014 
 Special Jury Award: More Than Honey of Markus Imhoof
 Audience Award Best Short Film for Kids: Die Sendung mit der Maus - The Source of the Runnel of  Sabine Ennulath and Christoph Biemann
 Wild Laugh: Bottle of Kirsten Lepore

2013 
 Heinz Sielmann Award for his lifetime achievement: David Attenborough

2012 
 sh:z Audience Award: Europe's Last Wild Horses of Christian Baumeister

2009 
 Prize for the Best Ecological Film: Cork – Forest in a Bottle of Mike Salisbury

External links 
 Official homepage (English)
 Video showing the production of the festival trophy

References 

Documentary film festivals in Germany